René Borchanne (5 September 1905 – 16 March 1979) was a Swiss writer. His work was part of the literature event in the art competition at the 1948 Summer Olympics.

References

1905 births
1979 deaths
20th-century Swiss writers
Olympic competitors in art competitions
People from Yverdon-les-Bains